Olivia Newton-John's Greatest Hits is the first greatest hits album by Olivia Newton-John released in 1977. In some regions, this  followed the 1974 compilation, First Impressions and therefore titled  as Greatest Hits Vol. 2.

The album collected all of Newton-John's American Top 40 singles released between 1971 and 1977. "Changes" was the only track not released as a single, but it was one of Newton-John's first self-written songs that she recorded. The album was Newton-John's first platinum certification peaking No. 13 Pop and No. 7 Country. It ended up being certified double Platinum in the US and Platinum in the UK and Canada, and also Gold in Hong Kong. The LP sold 133,660 and the cassette 27,150 copies in Japan.

Reception
Cash Box magazine called it "An excellent and well-rounded introduction to Olivia's work".

Track listing

Side One
"If Not for You" (Bob Dylan) - 2:50From If Not for You
"Changes" (Olivia Newton-John) - 2:27From If You Love Me, Let Me Know
"Let Me Be There" (John Rostill) - 3:00From Let Me Be There
"If You Love Me (Let Me Know)" (John Rostill) - 3:12From If You Love Me, Let Me Know
"I Honestly Love You" (Peter Allen - Jeff Barry) - 3:36 From If You Love Me, Let Me Know
"Have You Never Been Mellow" (John Farrar) - 3:28From Have You Never Been Mellow

Side Two
"Please Mr. Please" (Bruce Welch and John Rostill) - 3:24 From Have You Never Been Mellow
"Something Better to Do" (John Farrar) - 3:16  From Clearly Love
"Let It Shine" (Linda Hargrove) - 2:26From Clearly Love
"Come On Over" (Barry Gibb - Robin Gibb) - 3:38  From Come On Over
"Don't Stop Believin'" (John Farrar) - 3:37From Don't Stop Believin'
"Sam" (John Farrar - Hank Marvin - Don Black) - 3:41From Don't Stop Believin'''

2022 Deluxe Edition

"If Not For You" (Bob Dylan) - 2:53 From If Not for You"Banks of the Ohio" - 3:18 From If Not for You"Love Song" (Lesley Duncan) - 3:46 From If Not for You"Take Me Home, Country Roads" (Bill Danoff - John Denver - Taffy Nivert) - 3:23 From Let Me Be There"Changes" (Olivia Newton-John) - 2:32 From If You Love Me, Let Me Know"Let Me Be There" (John Rostill) - 3:01 From Let Me Be There"If You Love Me (Let Me Know)" (John Rostill) - 3:15 From If You Love Me, Let Me Know"I Honestly Love You" (Peter Allen - Jeff Barry) - 3:40 From If You Love Me, Let Me Know"Have You Never Been Mellow" (John Farrar) - 3:32 From Have You Never Been Mellow"Please Mr. Please" (Bruce Welch and John Rostill) - 3:25 From Have You Never Been Mellow"The Air That I Breathe" (Albert Hammond and Lee Hazlewood) - 3:52 From Have You Never Been Mellow"Something Better to Do" (John Farrar) - 3:18  From Clearly Love"Let It Shine" (Linda Hargrove) - 2:28 From Clearly Love"Every Face Tells A Story" (Linda Hargrove) - 3:59 From Don't Stop Believin"Jolene" (Dolly Parton) - 3:02 From Come On Over
"Come On Over" (Barry Gibb - Robin Gibb) - 3:42  From Come On Over
"Don't Stop Believin'" (John Farrar) - 3:32 From Don't Stop Believin'''
"Sam" (John Farrar - Hank Marvin - Don Black) - 3:43 From Don't Stop Believin
"Don't Cry For Me Argentina" (Andrew Lloyd Webber - Tim Rice) - 6:01 From Making a Good Thing Better
"Making A Good Thing Better" (Pete Wingfield) - 3:43 From Making a Good Thing Better

Charts

Weekly charts

Year-end charts

Certifications and sales

References

1977 greatest hits albums
Albums produced by John Farrar
Olivia Newton-John compilation albums
MCA Records compilation albums